The 2019 UK Music Video Awards were held on 23 October 2019 to recognise the best in music videos from United Kingdom and worldwide. The nominations were announced on 25 September 2019. British singer FKA Twigs led the nominations with seven.

Video of the Year

The Icon Award

Video Genre Categories

Craft and Technical Categories

Live and Interactive Categories

Individual and Company Categories

References

External links
Official website

UK Music Video Awards
UK Music Video Awards
UK Music Video Awards